Narraga nelvae is a species of moth of the  family Geometridae. It is found in Spain and North Africa.

Subspecies
Narraga nelvae nelvae (North Africa)
Narraga nelvae catalaunica Herbulot, 1943 (Spain)

References

Moths described in 1912
Macariini